Kafir-kala ("Fortress of the infidels") is an ancient fortress 12 kilometers south of the city center of Samarkand in Uzbekistan, protecting the southern border of the Samarkand oasis. It consists in a central citadel built in mud-bricks and measuring 75 × 75 meters at its base has six towers and is surrounded by a moat, still visible today. Living quarters were located outside the citadel.

Ruins
The citadel was first occupied by the Kidarites in the 4th-5th century CE, whose coinage and bullae have been found. A large amount of seals were discovered in Kafir Kala, including seals associated to the Kidarites, such as the one mentioning “the king of the Oghlar Huns, the great Kushanshah, the ǝfšyan of Samarkand.”

Many examples of coinage were excavated in Kafir-kala, which also show the transition from Sogdian to Islamic rule in the area of Samarkand with good precision.

Wooden gate

A calcinated wooden gate with elaborate decorations was discovered in 2017 in the throne room of the ruins of Kafir-kala, and was probably the gate to the throne room itself. The sculptures on the door represent adorations scenes for the goddess Nana, who stand centrally on a lion throne. 

The adorants are dressed in knee-length tunics, with long boots over trousers, suggesting clothing styles similar to those found in the paintings of Penjikent, and wear shoulder ribbons which have been associated with Hephthalites nobility. The gate is dated to the first half of the 6th century CE (500-550 CE), and the destruction of the palace is attributed to the Islamic conquest of Samarkand in 712 CE.

Artifacts

A Zoroastrian ossuary (with the shape of a cross, but unrelated to Christianity), dated 6-7th century CE, was also discovered in Kafir Kala. Numerous seals and pottery items have also been found.

Parallels

Some of the attendants in the murals of Penjikent are similar to the attendants in the Kafir-kala gate: adorants dressed in knee-length tunics, with long boots over large trousers, large necklaces, and shoulder ribbons which have been associated with Hephthalites nobility. These Penjikent murals are dated to circa 500 CE.

References

External links
 Location map of sites around Samarkand

Further reading
 

Populated places in Samarqand Region
Populated places along the Silk Road
Cities in Central Asia
Sogdian cities
Archaeological sites in Uzbekistan